Ayesha Gul is a Pakistani actress. She is known for her drama roles in Muqaddar, Bechari Qudsia, Mein Na Janoo, Safar Tamam Howa and Damsa.

Early life
Gul was born on August 8, 1980, in Quetta, Pakistan. She completed her studies from Kyrgyz State Medical Academy with (M.D) of doctor.

Career
She made her debut as an actress in 1998 on PTV. She made her acting debut in 2009 in reality show Nachaly. She got well known in Nachaly and she got many offers from many directors. She appeared in a lot of dramas on PTV Channel. She played lead roles in dramas Cactus Kay Phool, Aik Zindagi, Tum Bhul Gayi Hum Ko and Kachra Kundi. She got more popular and made her way to films such as Insaano Jaisay Loag. In 2017 she did a lead role in drama Dastaar e Anaa as Riffat, she was praised for her acting skills. She was praised by the audience for playing both negative and positive characters. In 2019 she appeared in drama Mein Na Janoo and Damsa. In 2020 she played a lead role as Farkhanda Begum in drama Muqaddar with Faysal Qureshi.

Filmography

Television

Telefilm

Film

References

External links
 
 

1980 births
Living people
20th-century Pakistani actresses
Pakistani television actresses
21st-century Pakistani actresses
Pakistani film actresses